Athletes from the Netherlands competed at the 1988 Winter Olympics in Calgary, Alberta, Canada.

Medalists

Competitors
The following is the list of number of competitors in the Games.

Speed skating

Men

Women

References

Official Olympic Reports
International Olympic Committee results database
Olympic Winter Games 1988, full results by sports-reference.com

Nations at the 1988 Winter Olympics
1988
W